WAJC 88.1 FM is a radio station licensed to Newport, Minnesota, and serving the south central Minneapolis–Saint Paul metropolitan area. The station broadcasts a Contemporary Christian music format and is owned by the Maranatha Assembly of God Church. Its transmitter is located in a park near Coates.

History
On April 19, 2010, the FCC granted a construction permit to the Religious Information Network for a new noncommercial radio station on 88.1 MHz at Newport, a southeastern suburb of the Twin Cities. RIN intended to program a listener-supported station with a variety of Christian and community programming. The first two letters of its call sign, WAJC, stood for the station manager's father, Walter Martin, and the last two stood for Jesus Christ. Its slogan was "Radio With a Mission". Among the programming planned for the station were recordings of Walter Martin's radio program, The Bible Answer Man.

The station began broadcasting in April 2013 and was branded "The Remnant". "The Remnant" was the student-produced Christian rock format from the University of Northwestern – St. Paul, which was simulcast on the HD4 subchannel of that school's KTIS-FM. In 2016, the station was sold to the Maranatha Assembly of God Church for $52,000.

Translator
In 2017, Maranatha Assembly of God Church purchased FM translator 91.7 W219DT in North Branch, Minnesota for $50,000, and the translator began rebroadcasting WAJC.

References

External links
 WAJC's website
 Maranatha Assembly of God Church's website
 

Contemporary Christian radio stations in the United States
Radio stations established in 2013
2013 establishments in Minnesota
Christian radio stations in Minnesota